Alfie Stokes (3 October 1932 – 30 March 2002 in Worthing). Born in Hackney and educated at the Parmiter's School he was a professional footballer who played for Tottenham Hotspur, Fulham, Cambridge City, Watford and represented England at England B   and schoolboy level.

Football career 
Stokes joined Tottenham from non-league side Clapton in February 1953. He scored on his debut in a 3-2 win over Bolton Wanderers at Burnden Park in April 1953. The prolific goal scorer found the net on 42 occasions in 69 appearances in all competitions for the club. In September 1957, Stokes scored five goals in a 7–1 win over Birmingham City at White Hart Lane-equalling a Football League record 

He transferred to Fulham in July 1959 for a £9.000 transfer deal and featured in 15 games and scoring six times for the West London club.

After a spell with Cambridge City, Stokes joined Watford in April 1961 where he went on to play 14 matches and finding the net on two occasions.

After football 
Stokes emigrated to Sydney, Australia and turned out for local team Budapest St George. He returned to the UK and settled in Homerton and was employed as a chauffeur. Stokes died in Worthing on 30 March 2002.

Between 1969 and 1971 Stokes was the school football coach for pupils attending Hackney Free and Parochial School arranging many inter-school matches for Hackney Schools. Ex-pupil of school

References 

1932 births
2002 deaths
Footballers from the London Borough of Hackney
English footballers
English Football League players
Clapton F.C. players
Tottenham Hotspur F.C. players
Fulham F.C. players
Cambridge City F.C. players
Watford F.C. players
England B international footballers
England under-23 international footballers
English Football League representative players
Association football forwards
People educated at Parmiter's School, London